Francisco Xavier de Luna Pizarro (November 3, 1780 – February 2, 1855) was a Peruvian priest, politician and lawyer. He served as Archbishop of Lima from 1846 to 1855, deputy for Cusco and Arequipa, and President of the Constituent Congresses of 1822, 1828 and 1834.

Early years and education
Educated in his native city and later at the University of Cusco, he taught theology and law at the seminary of Arequipa. He traveled to Spain and witnessed the resistance to the Napoleonic invasion. When he returned to Peru he was named rector of the College of Medicine of San Fernando.

War of Independence
He then participated in the efforts for the independence of Peru and was the president of the first Constituent Congress of 1822, and wrote the constitution of 1823. After José de San Martín renounced as the "Protector of Peru", Luna de Pizarro was chosen as interim President until the investiture of José de la Mar.

He supported the government of La Mar, but after the junta which La Mar presided was dissolved he retired from political life. In 1827 and 1828, he once again became President of the Congress and, in accordance with his functions, he once again was briefly chosen as interim President of Peru in 1833 until the investiture of General Luis José de Orbegoso y Moncada. He then served as the President of the Constituent Congress from December 1833 to March 1834.

In 1846 he was named archbishop of Lima.

References

See also
 Politics of Peru

1780 births
1855 deaths
Presidents of the Congress of the Republic of Peru
People from Arequipa
Presidents of Peru
Roman Catholic archbishops of Lima
People of the Peruvian War of Independence
Peruvian people of Spanish descent